Everything Went Black is a compilation album by the American hardcore punk band Black Flag. It was released in 1982 through SST Records. The compilation comprises early songs recorded before Henry Rollins became the band's vocalist in 1981, and was initially released without the group's name on its cover, due to their lawsuit with MCA/Unicorn. Instead, the names of the group members were listed on the first release.

Track listing
All songs written and composed by Greg Ginn, except where noted.

Side A

Keith Morris – vocals
"Gimmie Gimmie Gimmie" – 2:00
"I Don't Care"  – 0:58
"White Minority" – 1:09
"No Values" – 1:58
"Revenge" – 1:01
"Depression" – 2:07
"Clocked In" – 1:29
"Police Story" – 1:30
"Wasted"  – 0:42

Side B

Ron Reyes – vocals
"Gimmie Gimmie Gimmie" – 1:40
"Depression" – 2:40
"Police Story" – 1:33
 "Clocked In" – 1:36
 "My Rules" – 0:58

Dez Cadena – vocals
"Jealous Again" – 2:24
"Police Story" – 1:36
"Damaged I"  – 2:05
"Louie Louie"  – 1:27

Side C

Dez Cadena – vocals
"No More"  – 3:00
"Room 13"  – 2:08
"Depression" – 2:40
"Damaged II"  – 4:13
"Padded Cell"  – 1:53
"Gimmie Gimmie Gimmie" – 1:48

Side D
"Crass Commercialism" (Black Flag) – 17:34

(note: Crass Commercialism is not an actual song, but a collection of radio advertisements for Black Flag shows.)

Personnel
 Keith Morris (credited as "Johnny Bob Goldstein") – lead vocals on tracks 1-9
 Ron Reyes (credited as "Chavo Pederast") – lead vocals on tracks 10-14
 Dez Cadena – lead vocals on tracks 15-24
 Greg Ginn – guitar
 Chuck Dukowski – bass
 Bryan Migdol – drums on tracks 1-4
 Robo – drums on tracks 5-24

References

Black Flag (band) compilation albums
1982 compilation albums
SST Records compilation albums